Qeshlaq-e Qabaleh Gah Gol Aslan (also Romanized as Qeshlāq-e Qabaleh Gāh Gol Āṣlān) is a village in Qeshlaq-e Gharbi Rural District, Aslan Duz District, Parsabad County, Ardabil Province, Iran. At the 2006 census, its population was 22, in 4 families.

References 

Towns and villages in Parsabad County